Ikhsan Nul Zikrak (born 8 November 2002) is an Indonesian professional footballer who plays as an attacking midfielder or winger for Liga 1 club RANS Nusantara.

Club career

RANS Nusantara
On 23 April 2021, Zikrak was signed for RANS Nusantara to play in Liga 2 in the 2021–22 season. Zikrak made his first-team debut in a pre-season friendly against Liga 1 club Arema on 6 June 2021, and also scoring for his first team in a 6–2 loss. He made his league debut for RANS Nusantara when he was part of the starting lineup of a 2021 Liga 2 match against Persekat Tegal on 5 October in a 1–2 win. Until the end of the season, he contributed with 9 league appearances, and scored one goal in pre-season friendly match with RANS Nusantara, and also succeeded in bringing his first team to runner-up in Liga 2, and promotion to the highest tier league in Indonesia next season.

On 23 July 2022, Zikrak made his Liga 1 debut for the club in a match against PSIS Semarang, coming on as a substitute for Alfin Tuasalamony in the 79th minute. On 16 December 2022, he played full 90 minutes and scored his league goal of the season for the club in a 2–1 win against Bhayangkara.

On 30 January 2023, he scored the opening goal in a 3–1 loss over PSM Makassar. On 8 February, he scored another opening goal in a 2–1 loss to Arema.

Personal life
He is the younger brother of Muhammad Iqbal, who also a footballer and a former U-19 national team player in the Indra Sjafri era. Syamsuddin Batubara is his father as well as his first coach to start his career as a footballer. his father is the founder of the Soccer School of Football Association of Kudugantiang in Padang Pariaman.

Career statistics

Club

Notes

Honours

Club
RANS Cilegon
 Liga 2 runner-up: 2021

References

External links
 Ikhsan Zikrak at Soccerway
 Ikhsan Zikrak at Liga Indonesia

2002 births
Living people
People from Padang Pariaman Regency
Sportspeople from West Sumatra
Liga 1 (Indonesia) players
Liga 2 (Indonesia) players
RANS Nusantara F.C. players
Indonesian footballers
Association football midfielders